is a collection of essays written by the Japanese monk Kenkō (兼好) between 1330 and 1332. The work is widely considered a gem of medieval Japanese literature and one of the three representative works of the zuihitsu genre, along with The Pillow Book and the Hōjōki.

Structure and Content
Essays in Idleness comprises a preface and 243 passages, varying in length from a single line to a few pages. Kenkō, being a Buddhist monk, writes about Buddhist truths, and themes such as death and impermanence prevail in the work, although it also contains passages devoted to the beauty of nature as well as some accounts of humorous incidents. The original work was not divided or numbered; the division can be traced to the 17th century.

The work takes its title from its prefatory passage:

What a strange, demented feeling it gives me when I realize I have spent whole days before this inkstone, with nothing better to do, jotting down at random whatever nonsensical thoughts that have entered my head.

The poet Shōtetsu, who lived a hundred years after Kenkō, noted that Essays in Idleness resembled Sei Shōnagon's The Pillow Book in form, being composed of anecdotes, reminiscences, and homilies. Another influence on Kenkō was the eremitic tradition exemplified in Kamo no Chōmei's Ten-foot Square Hut.

Mystery of the Origin
Despite the distinguished work of Kenkō being continually held in high regard among many and considered a classic since the 17th century, the origin to the publication of Kenkō's work is unclear. Many people have speculated different theories to the arrival of his work, however, little is known to the exact manner of how the book itself was compiled and put together. One of the most popular beliefs held among the majority was concluded by Sanjonishi Saneeda (1511-1579), who stated that Kenkō himself did not edit the 243 chapters of his work, but rather, simply wrote his thoughts on random scrap pieces of paper which he pasted to the walls of his cottage. It was then hypothesized that Kenkō's friend, Imagawa Ryoshun, who was also a poet and general at that time, was the one who compiled the book together. After finding the notes on Kenkō's wall, he had prudently removed the scraps and combined the pieces together with other essays of Kenkō's which were found in possession by Kenkō's former servant, and carefully arranged the notes into the order it is found in today.

Modern critics today have rejected this account, skeptical of the possibility that any other individual aside from Kenkō himself could have put together such an insightful piece of work. However, the oldest surviving texts of Tsurezuregusa have been found in the hands of Ryoshun's disciple, Shotetsu, making Sanjonishi's theory to become widely considered by people today.

Theme of Impermanence
Throughout Essays in Idleness, a consistent theme regarding the impermanence of life is noted in general as a significant principle in Kenkō's work. Tsurezuregusa overall comprises this concept, making it a highly relatable work to many as it touches on the secular side among the overtly Buddhist beliefs mentioned in some chapters of the work.

Kenkō relates the impermanence of life to the beauty of nature in an insightful manner. Kenkō sees the aesthetics of beauty in a different light: the beauty of nature lies in its impermanence. Within his work, Kenkō quotes the poet Ton’a:
“It is only after the silk wrapper has frayed at top and bottom, and the mother-of-pearl has fallen from the roller, that a scroll looks beautiful.”

In agreement with this statement, Kenkō shows his support for an appreciation for the uncertain nature of things, and proposes the idea of how nothing lasts forever is a motivation for appreciation of what one has. Kenkō himself states this in a similar manner in his work:

“If man were never to fade away like the dews of Adashino, never to vanish like the smoke over Toribeyama, but lingered on forever in this world, how things would lose their power to move us!”

Kenkō clearly states his point of view regarding the nature of things in life, and regards the perishability of objects to be moving. In relation to the concept of impermanence, his works links to the fondness of the irregular and incomplete, and the beginnings and ends of things. Kenkō states:

“It is typical of the unintelligent man to insist on assembling complete sets of everything. Imperfect sets are better.”

Within his work, Kenkō shows the relation of impermanence to the balance of things in life. Beginnings and ends relate to the impermanence of things, and it is because of its impermanence that beginnings and ends are interesting and should be valued. Irregularity and incompleteness of collections and works show the potential for growth and improvement, and the impermanence of its state provides a moving framework towards appreciation towards life. Kenkō notes, “Branches about to blossom or gardens strewn with faded flowers are worthier of our admiration. In all things, it is the beginnings and ends that are interesting.”

Kenkō's work predominantly reveals these themes, providing his thoughts set out in short essays of work. Although his concept of impermanence is based upon his personal beliefs, these themes provide a basic concept relatable among many, making it an important classical literature resonating throughout Japanese high school curriculum today.

Translations
The definitive English translation is by Donald Keene (1967). In his preface Keene states that, of the six or so earlier translations into English and German, that by G. B. Sansom is the most distinguished. It was published by the Asiatic Society of Japan in 1911 as The Tsuredzure Gusa of Yoshida No Kaneyoshi: Being the Meditations of a Recluse in the 14th Century.

References

Translations
Keene, Donald, tr. (1998). Essays in Idleness: The Tsurezuregusa of Kenkō. New York: Columbia University Press. .
McKinney, Meredith, tr. (2013). Essays in Idleness and Hojiki. London: Penguin. 
Sansom, G. B., tr. (1998). Essays in Idleness: The Tsurezure Gusa of Yoshida Kenko. Noel Pinnington, ed. Stansted: Wordsworth Editions. .

Further reading 
Chance, Linda H (1997). Formless in Form: Kenkō, Tsurezuregusa,  and the Rhetoric of Japanese Fragmentary Prose. Stanford: Stanford University Press. .

External links
The full Japanese text of Tsurezuregusa, with translation into modern Japanese
English excerpts of Tsurezuregusa. Sansom's translation
Scanned whole book of English translation by William N. Porter (1914)
Video Narration "Tsurezuregusa" (At "Classics in Voice", created by X. Jie Yang, with pictorial commentaries from the Edo time)

Early Middle Japanese texts
1330s books
Philosophy essays